Oligactis asplundii is a species of flowering plant in the family Asteraceae. It is found only in Ecuador and it is threatened by habitat loss. Its natural habitat is subtropical or tropical moist montane forests.

References

asplundii
Flora of Ecuador
Vulnerable plants
Taxonomy articles created by Polbot